TM 1517 is a fossilized skull and lower mandible of the species Paranthropus robustus. It was discovered at Kromdraai, South Africa in 1938 by Robert Broom.

Its characteristics include bony ear tubes positioned below the plane of the cheek bones (more like humans than apes), and a forward set foramen magnum indicating a more erect posture than African apes. In comparison to the genus Australopithecus, TM 1517 is a bit larger, more robust with a flatter face and smaller canines.

See also
 List of fossil sites (with link directory)
 List of hominina (hominid) fossils (with images)

References

Image of TM 1517

Paranthropus fossils
Quaternary fossil record